The 1960–61 season was Port Vale's 49th season of football in the English Football League, and their second season in the Third Division. Aiming for promotion, the club were disappointed with their eventual seventh-place finish. The first season of the League Cup ended for Vale at the Second Round, whilst they exited the FA Cup at the Third Round. They did however taste success in the second and last Supporters' Clubs' Trophy series, beating rivals Stoke City 1–0 in a replay.

Overview

Third Division
The pre-season saw the club's management attempt to build a squad capable of promotion, this meant recruiting former Wales international inside-right Noel Kinsey from Birmingham City as a player-coach, and 21-year-old outside-left Dennis Fidler from the Manchester City Reserves. It also meant a concerted effort to sign a star forward, a £10,000 offer for Aston Villa's Gerry Hitchens was rejected, and the club's interest in Ronnie Allen also went nowhere. Instead 'bustling' Ted Calland  was signed on a free transfer from Exeter City. Fred Donaldson was sold to Exeter for £2,000. Vale Park was also improved, with yet more new drains installed to help ease the winter mud spots.

The season opened with a Harry Poole goal fifty seconds into an eventual 1–1 draw with Walsall in front of a season-best attendance of 15,504 on 20 August. Vale's campaign really got going nine days later however, with a sequence of three consecutive victories. This included a 7–1 'annihilation' of Chesterfield. Seven games without a win followed, ending with a collapse to an impressive Swindon Town side at The County Ground on 1 October. Vale were much improved after this, recording six wins from eight games. The following month Norman Low signed Bert Llewellyn from Crewe Alexandra for £7,000. Llewellyn scored past Barnsley in his debut game on 12 November, and scored a hat-trick past Hull City the next month. This win over the "Tigers" came a week after a 5–0 win over high-flying Grimsby Town at Blundell Park, in what Roy Sproson later described as his 'greatest memory' and 'one of their finest hours'. The performance was so impressive they received 'a standing ovation' from the home crowd, as the "Valiants" finished the game 'rolling the ball about like a game of chess'.

In sixth place, a 6–2 hammering from Walsall at Fellows Park on 17 December set them back. The goals continued, this time in Vale's favour, with a 5–0 win and 3–3 draw with Tranmere Rovers, and a 4–1 victory over Bury. In January, Albert Leake was transferred to Macclesfield Town, leaving Sproson as the only survivor of the legendary 1953–54 outfit. Vale continued to entertain and win games, as The Sentinel'''s Jon Abberley described Harry Poole as 'one of the best wing-halves ever produced in the Potteries. By 11 February, Vale were four points from second place, as Vale battled to a 1–1 draw with Torquay United in 'a sea of mud' at Plainmoor. A week later Llewellyn scored a hat-trick past Swindon Town. However, on 4 March QPR ended their promotion hopes with a 1–0 win at Loftus Road, the second of a streak of five games without a win for Vale. The next week Notts County easily beat Vale 3–1, in a game for which Stan Steele was rested after 195 consecutive appearances. Steele immediately handed in a transfer request, and got picked up by West Bromwich Albion for a £10,000 fee. Vale's season then petered out, ending with an attendance of only 4,088 for a 1–1 draw with Bristol City at Vale Park, followed by two away draws.

They finished in seventh place with 49 points, with their tally of 96 goals bettered only by the two promoted clubs. The season was a disappointment however, and their away record of two wins in twelve games was put to blame for killing their promotion hopes. Cliff Portwood scored an impressive 26 goals, followed closely by Bert Llewellyn on 20 (who had also scored 10 for Crewe).

Finances
On the financial side, a disappointing home attendance average of 9,702 was a concern, though a profit of £4,253 was recorded. This was down to a £9,501 donation from the Sportsmen's Association and a slashing of the wage bill by around £4,000 to £29,915. The management decided to cut the playing staff but to increase the wage budget. Eleven players were let go, crucially: Harry Oscroft (Brantham Athletic), Ted Calland (Lincoln City), John Poole (Macclesfield Town), and Peter Hall (Bournemouth & Boscombe Athletic).

Cup competitions
In the FA Cup, Vale were superior to non-league Chelmsford City, winning 3–2 in the First Round clash. Fourth Division Carlisle United were Vale's Second Round opponents, who Vale dispatched 2–1. Struggling Second Division side Swansea Town bettered Vale on a mud-filled and hole-ridden Vetch Field.

In the League Cup, they bettered Queens Park Rangers in a replay following a 2–2 draw at Loftus Road. They next round held Tranmere Rovers, who eliminated Vale with a 2–0 win.

In the Supporters' Clubs' Trophy, the two leg game with rivals Stoke City came to a 1–1 draw, and so a replay was held at the Victoria Ground on 24 April, which Vale won 1–0 thanks to an own goal.

League table

ResultsPort Vale's score comes first''

Football League Third Division

Results by matchday

Matches

FA Cup

League Cup

Supporters' Clubs' Trophy

Player statistics

Appearances

Top scorers

Transfers

Transfers in

Transfers out

References
Specific

General

Port Vale F.C. seasons
Port Vale